Tímea Babos and Lucie Šafářová were the defending champions, but chose not to participate together.  Babos played alongside Kristina Mladenovic, but lost in the semifinals to Raquel Kops-Jones and Abigail Spears. Šafářová teamed up with Belinda Bencic, but lost in the first round to Kimiko Date-Krumm and Karolína Plíšková.
Bethanie Mattek-Sands and Sania Mirza won the title, defeating Kops-Jones and Spears in the final, 6–3, 6–3.

Seeds

Draw

Draw

References
 Draw

W